Wesly Felix (born 4 March 1947) is a former boxer from Haiti, who competed in the welterweight (- 67 kg) division at the 1976 Summer Olympics. Felix lost his opening bout to Clinton Jackson of the United States.

References

1947 births
Living people
Welterweight boxers
Olympic boxers of Haiti
Boxers at the 1976 Summer Olympics
Haitian male boxers